The 12707 / 12708 Andhra Pradesh Sampark Kranti Express is a South Central Railway train running from New Delhi to Tirupati. It is part of the Sampark Kranti Express series of trains, which link the Indian national capital, New Delhi with the rest of the state capitals, with only a limited number of stops on each service.

Service 
The Andhra Pradesh Sampark Kranti Express commenced operations between Secunderabad and Hazrat Nizamuddin near New Delhi.  On 6 July 2005, Shri Anjan Kumar Yadav, MP, and Hyderabad mayor, Teegala Krishna Reddy, flagged off the train from Secunderabad station when the service was extended to Tirupati via Kurnool, Dhone and Kadapa.

The Andhra Pradesh Sampark Kranti Express operates as a three times a week train service between Secunderabad, Hazrat Nizamuddin and Tirupati.

Before the Andhra Pradesh Sampark Kranti Express was introduced, the (12625/12626) Kerala Express between New Delhi and Trivandrum was the only daily train connecting the Tirupati and New Delhi.

Coach Composition 

Present coach composition comprises 2-SLR coaches, 2-II/General coaches, 4- AC 3 Tier Coaches, 1-AC 2 Tier Coach, 1-Pantry, 1- 1st AC Coach and 9-Sleeper coaches.  During the summer extra coaches are provided based on need.  An additional 3 tier AC coach was added in September 2012.

Route & Halts

The schedule is given below:-

Locomotive

Lallaguda Loco shed WAP-7 Attached from Tirupati to Hazrat Nizamuddin.Diesel Loco from Gooty Shed WDP-4D attached from Kurnool TO Kacheguda.Becoz The Route is still not electrified from Kurnool to Gadwal. So diesel loco attached

Gallery

See also 

 Andhra Pradesh Express
 Hussainsagar Express
 Goa Sampark Kranti Express
 Madhya Pradesh Sampark Kranti Express

References

External links 
 
 12707 Time Table
 12708 Time Table

Transport in Tirupati
Transport in Delhi
Sampark Kranti Express trains
Rail transport in Uttar Pradesh
Rail transport in Madhya Pradesh
Rail transport in Andhra Pradesh
Rail transport in Telangana
Rail transport in Maharashtra
Rail transport in Delhi
Railway services introduced in 2005